Below is a brief timeline covering the history of the petroleum industry Alberta and its predecessor states.

References 

Environmental issues in Canada
History of Alberta
Alberta timelines
History of the petroleum industry in Canada